The Jersey Triad was a triumvirate stable active in World Championship Wrestling (WCW) from mid-to-late 1999. The group consisted of Diamond Dallas Page, Chris Kanyon and Bam Bam Bigelow. Their name came from the members being billed from New Jersey (although Kanyon was actually from New York).

History

Formation
Shortly after Slamboree in May 1999, Diamond Dallas Page formed an alliance with fellow New Jerseyan Bam Bam Bigelow and began feuding with Perry Saturn and Raven for the WCW World Tag Team Championship.

On the May 31, 1999 episode of Nitro, Page and Bigelow sent Raven to the hospital after a severe beating, leaving Saturn alone to defend the Tag Team Titles, which Page and Bigelow won later that night with help from Chris Kanyon replacing Raven in the match and turned heel on former ally Raven, costing the team the championships by letting Page pin him.

Page, Bigelow, and Kanyon became known as the Jersey Triad after Kanyon officially joined them on the June 7, 1999 episode of Nitro, when he turned on Saturn after Chris Benoit and Saturn defeated Page and Bigelow.

Page and Kanyon lost the Tag Titles to Saturn and Benoit on the June 10 episode of Thunder but the Triad regained the belts three days later at The Great American Bash on June 13, 1999, after Kanyon pinned Benoit.

"Freebird Rule"
Due to an affiliation with then "WCW President for Life" Ric Flair, the Triad was permitted to defend these titles in any way possible using the Freebird Rule- any two of the three wrestlers could defend the tag team titles at any time. This even saw the Triad switching members during a title defense, the rule being one member had to be on the floor at all times.

On July 11, 1999 at Bash at the Beach the Jersey Triad defeated Benoit and Saturn again to retain their Tag Team Titles.

The team held the titles until Road Wild where Kanyon and Bigelow would lose them to Harlem Heat on August 14, 1999. In the same night Chris Benoit defeated Diamond Dallas Page to retain his WCW United States Championship, despite interference from Kanyon and Bigelow

Break up and aftermath
The group broke up shortly after Fall Brawl in September 1999, after Goldberg pinned Page. Diamond Dallas Page continued feuding with Hogan again, joining Sid Vicious and Rick Steiner in a team effort to take on Hogan, Sting, and Goldberg. Soon after that feud ended Page turned into a hero again and feuded with both Kanyon and Bigelow before the year ended. Both Page and Bigelow feuded with Kanyon during his Chris "Champagne" Kanyon gimmick.

Page and Kanyon would eventually reunite as a tag team in the World Wrestling Federation (WWF) during the WCW Invasion storyline, as they were both members of the Alliance in 2001. The pair held the WWF Tag Team Championship once.

Bam Bam Bigelow passed away in 2007 from an accidental drug overdose, also complicated by heart disease. Chris Kanyon, struggling with depression and bipolar disorder, committed suicide by overdose in 2010. This leaves Page the only surviving member of the group, who has become immensely successful with his DDP Yoga programs (formerly Yoga for Regular Guys). His recovery from back and spinal injuries through yoga allowed him to compete in WWE’s Royal Rumble match in 2015, as well as his final match in All Elite Wrestling in 2020. He remains retired from the ring, focusing on his DDP Yoga brand.

Championships and accomplishments
World Championship Wrestling
WCW World Tag Team Championship (2 times)
World Wrestling Federation
WWF Tag Team Championship (1 time) – Page and Kanyon

See also
The Diamond Exchange
The Fabulous Freebirds
The Insiders (professional wrestling)
The Triple Threat

References

World Championship Wrestling teams and stables